Xabier 'Xabi' Etxebarria Larrabide (born 20 July 1987) is a Spanish professional footballer who plays as a defender.

Club career
Born in Igorre, Biscay, Etxebarria was signed by Athletic Bilbao from Tercera División side Zamudio SD in 2008, initially brought up to its reserve team. He made his first appearance for the main squad in a 5–0 friendly win against Aviron Bayonnais FC, on 3 September 2008. Three months later, in another exhibition game, he started and scored in a 7–2 victory over amateurs JD Somorrostro.

Etxebarria made his La Liga debut for Athletic on 7 December 2008, coming on as an 89th-minute substitute for David López in a 1–1 draw at Racing de Santander. He was released by the Lions in June 2012 after a further three full seasons with the B side in the Segunda División B and only one more official appearance for the first team, a 3–0 away loss against FC Barcelona in the 2009 edition of the Supercopa de España.

On 18 July 2014, after two years without a club, Etxebarria joined SD Amorebieta. He continued competing in the third tier the following years, with Barakaldo CF and SD Leioa.

References

External links

1987 births
Living people
Spanish footballers
Footballers from the Basque Country (autonomous community)
Association football defenders
La Liga players
Segunda División B players
Tercera División players
Tercera Federación players
Zamudio SD players
Bilbao Athletic footballers
Athletic Bilbao footballers
SD Amorebieta footballers
Barakaldo CF footballers
SD Leioa players